Kalateh-ye Hajji Nasir (also Romanized as Kalāteh-ye Ḩājjī Naṣīr; also known as Kalāteh-ye Shāh Moḩammad) is a village in Dowlatkhaneh Rural District, Bajgiran District, Quchan County, Razavi Khorasan Province, Iran. In 2006, its population was 264, in 71 families.

References 

Populated places in Quchan County